"Count to Three" is a song by British-American synthpop duo Red Flag. It was released as a single in 1990. The song reached the top 20 on the US Billboard Hot Dance Club Play chart, peaking at #13.

Track listing
12" maxi-single
Catalog#: 7 75545-0
Side A
 "Count to Three" (Power Mix) (6:59)
 "Give Me Your Hand" (Razormaid Mix) (6:53)
 "Count to Three" (Razormaid Remix) (6:49)

Side AA
 "Count to Three" (House Mix) (7:35)
 "Count to Three" (House Dub) (6:07)
 "Count to Three" (7" Edit) (4:22)

Chart position

References

1990 songs
1990 singles
Red Flag (band) songs
Enigma Records singles